Marvin Ponce served as deputy of the National Congress of Honduras.
Marvin Ponce is widely known among Hondurans for throwing a glass full of water to congress colleague on national TV. On April 12, 2018, while discussing the subject of a national political dialogue, he became involved in a verbal altercation with Nelson Avila, political advisor to the LIBRE party. Both men exchanged insults, Ponce threatened to throw water to his opponent. Marvin Ponce is also the uncle of Cristian Mayorga. strongly criticized for Jnews.

References

Living people
Deputies of the National Congress of Honduras
Year of birth missing (living people)
Place of birth missing (living people)